Come Clean is the debut studio album by the rock band Puddle of Mudd. Released on August 28, 2001, the album's music was responsible for breaking Puddle of Mudd into the mainstream music scene. It features the singles "Control," "Blurry," "Drift & Die" and "She Hates Me". Various tracks were re-recorded from the band's previous releases, Stuck and Abrasive. The album was the band's biggest hit on the US Billboard 200, peaking at number nine.

The album has sold over 5,000,000 copies and was certified 3× Platinum by the RIAA.

Reception

Come Clean received mixed reviews from critics. AllMusic and Rolling Stone said that Puddle of Mudd did not stand out from other post-grunge bands with this album. In contrast, Stephanie Dickison of PopMatters touted Come Clean as the band's "album of the year".

Track listing 

Some copies of the album have one or both of the following bonus tracks:

"Abrasive" – 3:14
"Control" (Acoustic) – 4:09

Personnel

Puddle of Mudd
Wes Scantlin – lead vocals, rhythm guitar
Paul Phillips – lead guitar
Doug Ardito – bass guitar, backing vocals
Josh Freese – drums

Additional personnel
Andy Wallace – mixing
Steve Twigger – string arrangements
 Kate Schermerhorn – cover photo

A&R / Coordinators 
Fred Durst – A&R
Danny Wimmer – A&R Coordinator 
Les Scurry – Production Coordinator

Charts

Weekly charts

Year-end charts

Decade-end charts

Certifications

References

Puddle of Mudd albums
2001 debut albums
Geffen Records albums
Nu metal albums by American artists